Tetyana Kit (born 1 September 1994 in Lviv) is a Ukrainian freestyle wrestler of Spartak sports club. She was bronze medalist of the 2015 World Championships and silver medalist of the European championships in 2016.

In 2021, she won one of the bronze medals in her event at the 2021 Poland Open held in Warsaw, Poland. She represented Ukraine at the 2020 Summer Olympics in Tokyo, Japan. She competed in the women's 57 kg event.

References

External links
 

1994 births
Living people
Ukrainian female sport wrestlers
Sportspeople from Lviv
World Wrestling Championships medalists
European Wrestling Championships medalists
Wrestlers at the 2020 Summer Olympics
Olympic wrestlers of Ukraine
21st-century Ukrainian women